Karimabad (also Romanized as Karīmābād) is a village in Qolqol Rud Rural District, Qolqol Rud District, Tuyserkan County, Hamadan Province, Iran. At the 2006 census, its population was 431, in 93 families.

References 

Populated places in Tuyserkan County